Rodney Scott Melville is a presiding judge in Santa Barbara County's superior court. He was the judge in Michael Jackson's 2005 child molestion trial, in which Jackson was acquitted.

Biography
Melville was born in 1941 and studied at San Diego State University and Hastings College of the Law, University of California.

Melville, now living in Sacramento, California, became an attorney for the firm Melville & Iwasko and became a State Certified Specialist in Family Law. He served as a Deputy District Attorney in the San Bernardino County District Attorney's Office for two years.

In 1987, Melville was appointed to the Municipal Court Bench in 1987. After three years he was promoted to the Superior Court.

Melville retired as a judge for the Superior Court in 2007, having served 17 years.

People v. Jackson
In 2005, Michael Jackson was accused of child molestation by a 13-year-old boy. The case went to court and Melville was appointed the presiding judge. Prior to the start of the trial, Melville banned cameras from the courtroom, put a gag order on both sides and oversaw a three-day jury selection procedure.

References

Living people
San Diego State University alumni
University of California, Hastings College of the Law alumni
Superior court judges in the United States
Year of birth missing (living people)